The Homecoming is a play by Harold Pinter.

The Homecoming may also refer to:

 The Homecoming (film), a 1973 film based on Pinter's play
 The Homecoming (statue), an American statue honoring members of the sea services
 The Homecoming, a 1989 play by August Wilson
 "The Homecoming", a 2011 short story by Mike Resnick
 The Homecoming, a 1975 album by Hagood Hardy
 "The Homecoming", a song by Hagood Hardy from the album of the same name
 The Homecoming (novel) by Andrew Pyper

In television:
 The Homecoming (TV series), a Singaporean Chinese-language drama
 "The Homecoming" (Star Trek: Deep Space Nine), an episode of Star Trek: Deep Space Nine
 "The Homecoming" (The O.C.), an episode of The O.C.
 The Homecoming: A Christmas Story, a 1971 TV movie, the pilot for the series The Waltons

See also 
 Homecoming (disambiguation)
 Coming Home (disambiguation)